Olga Raonić (born 31 December 1986 in Belgrade) is a Serbian volleyball player who plays as an outside hitter. 

She competed in the 2013 FIVB World Grand Prix.

Clubs

References

External links
Player info CEV
 Player info OSM

1986 births
Living people
Serbian women's volleyball players
Sportspeople from Belgrade

Serbian expatriate sportspeople in Greece
Serbian expatriate sportspeople in Germany
Serbian expatriate sportspeople in Poland